Carl Martin August Møller (24 August 1887 – 27 August 1948) was a Danish rower who competed in the 1912 Summer Olympics.

He was a crew member of the Danish boat, which won the gold medal in the coxed fours, inriggers.

References

External links
Carl Møller's profile at databaseOlympics

1887 births
1948 deaths
Danish male rowers
Rowers at the 1912 Summer Olympics
Olympic rowers of Denmark
Olympic gold medalists for Denmark
Olympic medalists in rowing
Sportspeople from Aarhus
Medalists at the 1912 Summer Olympics